ΑΟ Episkopi Football Club, short for Athlitikos Omilos Episkopis, is a Greek football club based in Episkopi, Rethymno. It was founded in 1962. They currently play in the Super League Greece 2, the second tier of the Greek football league system.

History
Episkopi made 11 appearances in the Delta Ethniki, where they have been playing continuously since 2003. In 2012, they were promoted to the Football League 2 for the first time in their history as champions of Delta Ethniki's 10th Group.

Crest and colours

Players

Current squad

Honours
Fourth Division
Winners (2): 2012, 2020
Rethymno FCA Championship
Winners (2): 1990, 2001
Rethymno FCA Cup
Winners (3): 2003, 2007, 2010

References

External links
Official website
Rethymno Football Clubs Association 

 
Football clubs in Rethymno
Football clubs in Crete
Association football clubs established in 1962
1962 establishments in Greece
Super League Greece 2 clubs